Carl Iwan Clowes OBE (11 December 1943 – 4 December 2021) was a Welsh medical practitioner. In 1978 he founded the Nant Gwrtheyrn trust in order to buy the village of Nant Gwrtheyrn, to restore, regenerate and set up a Welsh language centre.

Clowes was born and brought up in Manchester, his mother was Welsh (who spoke Welsh) and his father was English. When his parents returned to north Wales, he set about learning Welsh. After qualifying as a doctor in 1967, he spent eight years as a doctor in Llanaelhaearn, Llŷn peninsula before gaining a Masters in Social Medicine from the London School of Hygiene and Tropical Medicine.

In 1974, he was the inaugural chairman of Antur Aelhaearn; the first Community Co-operative in the United Kingdom, established to save the local school, and he was also the inaugural chairman and President of Dolen Cymru, the Wales-Lesotho relationship that was established. in 1985.

Personal life
He was married and had four children including Dafydd and Cian who were members of the band Super Furry Animals.

He died at his home of Llecyn Llon, Pencaenewydd at the age of 77 years. A private service was held for only the family at Sant Aelhaearn Church, Llanaelhaearn on 18 December 2021 and he was laid to rest at Llanaelhaearn cemetery, with a public service of remembrance and a celebration of his life at 'Neuadd y Nant' (Nant Hall), Nant Gwrtheyrn the same day.

Publications
 Super Furries, Prins Seeiso, Miss Siberia – A Fi (Y Lolfa, 2016)
 Nant Gwrtheyrn (Book) (Y Lolfa, 2004)
 Strategaeth Iaith 1991–2001 (National Welsh language forum, 1991)

References

1943 births
2021_deaths
Welsh language activists
Welsh-language writers
20th-century Welsh writers
21st-century Welsh writers
Welsh children's writers
People from Manchester